Eberhart Steel Products Company was an American aircraft parts manufacturer, formed in 1918 in Buffalo, New York.  In 1922 Eberhart received a contract to rebuild 50 Royal Aircraft Factory S.E.5A's, redesignated Eberhart S.E.5E.  Eberhart also converted the French made SPAD S.XIII, replacing the French engine with an American made Wright-Hispano E.  In 1925 Eberhart Aeroplane and Motor Company was formed as a subsidiary of Eberhart Steel.  The only aircraft Eberhart Aeroplane created was the Eberhart XFG.

Aircraft

References

Citations

Bibliography
 

Defunct aircraft manufacturers of the United States